Different Times is a musical with music, lyrics, and book by Michael Brown. It was originally produced on Broadway in 1972. It opened on May 1, 1972 at the ANTA Playhouse and closed on May 20, 1972	after 24 performances.

Plot
The show follows a Boston family from 1905 to 1970. It covers the decades and the issues like women's rights, both World Wars, anti-Semitism, and youth protest.

Song List
Act 1
Different Times - Stephen Adams Levy
Seeing the Sights - People of 1905
The Spirit is Moving - Margaret Adams and People of 1905
Here's Momma - Margaret Adams
Everything in the World Has a Place - Gregory Adams and Margaret Adams
I Wish I Didn't Love Him - Margaret Adams
Forward Into Tomorrow - Mrs. Daniel Webster Hepplewhite and Suffragettes
You're Perfect - Angela Adams
Marianne - Officer, Doughboys, Marianne, Columbia and Kaiser
Daddy, Daddy - Hazelnuts
I Feel Grand - Hazel Hughes and Hazelnuts
Sock Life in the Eye - Larry Lawrence Levy
I'm Not Through - Larry Lawrence Levy and Marathon Dancers
Act 2
I Miss Him - Hattie, Pauline and Mae Verne
One More Time - Kimberly Langley and Keynoters
Here's Momma (Reprise) - Stephen Adams Levy
I Dreamed About Roses - Stephen Adams Levy, Kimberly Langley and USO Guests
I Wish I Didn't Love Her (Reprise) - Gregory Adams
The Words I Never Said - Stephen Adams Levy and Kimberly Langley
The Life of a Woman - Kimberly Langley
Here's Momma (Reprise) - Kimberly Langley and Momma's Poppas
He Smiles - Abigail and Josie
Genuine Plastic - Stephen Adams Levy and Gallery Guests
Thanks a Lot - Frank, Abigail and Friends
When They Start Again - Abigail and Frank
Different Times (Reprise) - Stephen Adams Levy
The Spirit is Moving (Reprise) - Company

Productions
The 1972 Broadway production was written and directed by Michael Brown, who also supplied the music and lyrics. It was choreographed by Todd Jackson, scenic design and costume design by David Guthrie, lighting design by Martin Aronstein and his partner Lawrence Metzler. It starred Karin Baker, Mary Jo Catlett, Candace Cooke, Ronnie DeMarco, Dorothy Frank, Patti Karr, Joe Masiell, Terry Nicholson, Joyce Nolen, Mary Bracken Phillips, Jamie Ross, Sam Stoneburner, David Thomé, Barbara Williams, and Ronald Young. In 1987, the original cast reassembled to make a recording that was issued on the Painted Smiles label.

References

Broadway musicals
1972 musicals
Original musicals